FidoTV is an American digital cable channel that is dedicated solely to dog lovers. Programming on the channel features shows about dogs.

Programming
 Who Gets the Dog? (TV program)
 Pick a Puppy
 The DogFather
 Send In the Dogs Australia
 End of My Leash
 Pet Heroes
 Pet Hair Eraser
 Tibor to the Rescue
 Puppy S.O.S.
 Which Woof's For Me?

References

External links

Best Organic Dog Food

American companies established in 2016
Television networks in the United States
Dogs in the United States
2016 establishments in Colorado